Daniel of Morley (c. 1140 – c. 1210) was an English scholastic philosopher and astronomer.

Life
He apparently came from Morley, Norfolk, and is said to have been educated at Oxford. 
Thence he proceeded to the University of Paris, and applied himself especially to the study of mathematics, but dissatisfied with the teaching there he left for Toledo, then famous for its school of Arabian philosophy. 
At Toledo, he remained for some time.
 
Morley returned to England with a valuable collection of books. 
He was apparently disappointed at the neglect of science in England, and a passage in his book has been interpreted to mean that he was on the point of setting out again for foreign parts when he met John of Oxford, Bishop of Norwich, who persuaded him to remain. 
The date of Morley's death is unknown.

Works
Morley was author of a book called both Philosophia Magistri Danielis de Merlac, and Liber de Naturis inferiorum et superiorum, dedicated to John of Oxford. From the preface is derived all that is known of Morley's life.

The Arundel MS. divides the work into two books, one, De superiori parte mundi, the other, De inferiori parte mundi; in it Morley quotes frequently from Arabian and Greek philosophers, and vaunts the superiority of the former. He is not free, however, from astrological superstitions.

Another copy of the work is No. 95 in the Corpus Christi College, Oxford, MSS., and is erroneously catalogued under W. de Conchys. 
This copy lacks the preface, and mentions a third book of the work beginning 'Seneca loquens ad Lucilium,' which is not in the Arundel MS.

References

Attribution

1140s births
1210s deaths
English philosophers